Senftenberg is a town in the district of Krems-Land in the Austrian state of Lower Austria.

Geography
The municipality consists of six subdivisions:
 Imbach (population: 580)
 Meislingeramt (population: 55)
 Priel (population: 123)
 Reichaueramt (population: 60)
 Senftenberg (population: 1046)
 Senftenbergeramt (population: 107)

Population

Sights
Burgruine Senftenberg

References

External links

Cities and towns in Krems-Land District